Ajuran may refer to:

 Ajuran Sultanate, a medieval Somali empire
 Ajuran (clan), a Somali clan
 Ajuran currency, a medieval currency